Oreodytes obesus is a species of predaceous diving beetle in the family Dytiscidae. It is found in North America.

Subspecies
These two subspecies belong to the species Oreodytes obesus:
 Oreodytes obesus cordillerensis Larson, 1990
 Oreodytes obesus obesus (LeConte, 1866)

References

Further reading

 
 
 

Dytiscidae
Articles created by Qbugbot
Beetles described in 1866